The Talysh alphabet (Talysh: Tolışə əlifba) was created for Talysh language in 1930 by Talysh poet Zolfaghar Ahmadzadeh based on Latin script. Before that, the alphabet based on Cyrillic and Arabic scripts were widely used.

In the Talysh alphabet, 29 phonemes are indicated by 29 letters.

References

Talysh culture
History of Talysh